"Hands" is the second single from American rock band the Raconteurs' debut album, Broken Boy Soldiers. Released in the United Kingdom on July 31, 2006, one of the B-sides is a live rendition of "It Ain't Easy", a cover version of Ron Davies's song. The music video for "Hands" was shot at the Dikemark psychiatric hospital in Asker (outside Oslo), Norway on July 4, 2006.

Track listings
CD
 "Hands"
 "Intimate Secretary" (live)

7-inch (D)
 "Hands"
 "Store Bought Bones" (The Zane Rendition)

7-inch (E)
 "Hands" (live)
 "It Ain't Easy" (live)

Charts

References

2006 singles
2006 songs
The Raconteurs songs
Songs written by Brendan Benson
Songs written by Jack White
Third Man Records singles
XL Recordings singles
V2 Records singles